Afghanistan has competed in 15 Summer Games. They have never appeared in any Winter Games. The country made its first appearance at the Berlin Games in 1936. It has sent a delegation to 14 of the 19 Summer Games since then. It is organised by the Afghanistan National Olympic Committee, which is currently presided by Nazar Mohammad Mutmaeen.

History 

The country made its first appearance at the Berlin Games in 1936. 

Afghanistan competed at the 1948 Summer Olympics in London, sending a total of 31 competitors, which consisted of the men's field hockey and football teams. This is the highest number of athletes that Afghanistan has ever sent to a Summer Olympic Games.

Afghanistan's football tournament culminated in Afghanistan being defeated 6-0 against Luxembourg, and they failed to qualify to the first round of the tournament. At the men's field hockey tournament won one match, drew one match and lost one match, resulting in placing third of four competing teams, with 3 points. Therefore, Afghanistan did not proceed to the semi-finals, finishing third in their respective group.

In the following 1952 Games at Helsinki, Afghanistan did not participate. However, Afghanistan returned for the 1956 Games at Melbourne, sending a team of 12 for the men's field hockey tournament, with six of the competitors on the team having participated previously in 1948.

Afghanistan did not send a team, sending an official to the Barcelona Games in 1992, and sent only two representatives to the Atlanta Games in 1996: light-middleweight boxer Mohammad Jawid Aman was disqualified after he arrived too late for the mandatory weigh-in and draw, which left marathon runner Abdul Baser Wasiqi as the country's sole representative. Wasiqi pulled a hamstring before the race, but competed nonetheless, limping his way through the marathon and finishing last.

The ANOC was suspended by the IOC in 1999, and Afghanistan were subsequently banned from the Sydney Games in 2000 due to their discrimination against women under the rule of the Taliban and prohibition of sports of any kind. The country was re-instated in 2002 following the fall of the Taliban, and sent five representatives to the Athens Games in 2004.

Among them were two women, Robina Muqim Yaar and Friba Razayee, the first ever women to compete for Afghanistan at the Olympics.

Afghanistan sent a team of four competitors, including three men and one woman, Mehboba Ahdyar, to the Beijing Games of 2008. Ahdyar has received death threats due to her intended participation in the Games.

Afghanistan won their first summer Olympic medal during the 2008 Beijing Games, with Rohullah Nikpai winning a bronze in men's Taekwondo 58 kg, and their second at the 2012 Games with another bronze for Nikpai in the men's 68kg taekwondo event.

Afghanistan returned for a fourth consecutive games,  at Rio de Janeiro in 2016. Rohullah Nikpai, who had earned a medal at the two previous games in taekwando did not return. Instead, three athletes were sent, competing in two sports - Athletics and Judo. None of the athletes managed to progress and qualify further in their events. Despite finishing last in the women's 100 metres, Kamia Yousufi became Afghanistan's national record holder with 14.02 seconds, which was also at her Olympic debut. She also ran her preliminary heat in a full-body kit and hijab.

In April 2021, the ANOC announced that Fahim Anwari will become the first swimmer to represent Afghanistan at the Olympics. Afghanistan received an invitation from the Tripartite Commission to send a men's rifle shooter, Mahdi Yovari, marking the nation's Olympic debut in the sport.

Afghanistan's status is unclear for future participation since being brought under the political turmoil.

Medal tables

Medals by Summer Games

Medals by summer sport 

Note: Afghanistan was banned from the Olympics in 2000 for its discrimination against women under the Taliban regime at the time.

List of medalists

See also
 List of flag bearers for Afghanistan at the Olympics
 List of participating nations at the Summer Olympic Games
 :Category:Olympic competitors for Afghanistan
 Afghanistan at the Paralympics
 Afghanistan at the Asian Games
 Sport in Afghanistan

References

External links
 
 
 
 Afghan Sports History